St. Petersburg Christian University (SPbCU) is a Baptist Christian University located in St. Petersburg, Russia.

History
The school was founded in 1990 as a bible college in Belorechensk, Krasnodar Krai by the Russian Union of Evangelical Christians-Baptists. In 1992, the school moved to St. Petersburg, Russia. In 1993, the school became a university.

References

External links
 St.Petersburg Christian University website
 SPbCU Lodging Center
 Сайт СПбХУ
 Сайт Гостиничного комплекса СПбХУ

Universities in Saint Petersburg
Baptist universities and colleges
Educational institutions established in 1990
1990 establishments in Russia